Al Artawiyah is a Bedouin camp (hijrah) in Riyadh Province, Saudi Arabia, on the road between Riyadh and Kuwait.

History
The town is a center for the Mutair Bedouin tribe, who were displaced to that region by the Alharbi and Almutiri tribes after having migrated to Najd.

Artawiyah was one of the earliest settlements of the Ikhwan Wahhabi militia movement which appeared in the early part of the 20th century. This conservative group mandated strict gender rules in the town, with women banned from the public well and marketplace, instead using personal wells at each household, and gathering at the mosque steps to silently trade with vendors who arrived there. Faisal al-Dawish, who played a large role in the campaign to aid King Abdul Aziz, was then the head of the Mutair and leader of the Artawiyah community.

Climate

See also 

 List of cities and towns in Saudi Arabia

References

Populated places in Riyadh Province